The Confession of Faith, also called the First London Baptist Confession, is Particular Baptist confession of faith.

Origin 
In 1644, seven Particular Baptist (Reformed Baptist or Calvinistic Baptist) churches met in London to write a confession of faith. The document, called First London Baptist Confession, was published in 1644.

Doctrine 
This confession of faith contains 53 articles. It contains the doctrine of the believers' Church and the believer's baptism.

References

External links
 

1644 works
1646 works
Baptist statements of faith
History of Christianity in England
17th-century Christian texts
Reformed confessions of faith
Baptist Christianity in England
17th-century Calvinism